The South Africa national development football team, is a development football (soccer) team, which represents South Africa and is controlled by the South African Football Association, the governing body for football in South Africa. The team's main objective is to give international exposure to fringe home-based players, by allowing them to play 'B-level' internationals. Since the advent of the African Nations Championship, the team now attempts to qualify for and play at the event. Since 2008 SAFA have sent the team to the COSAFA Cup, instead of the senior team. The team has played at one African Nations Championship and two COSAFA Cups.

Player eligibility
African Championship of Nations regulations require teams to be made up only of players from the association's national leagues. As the team is not an official national team, and does not play in FIFA sanctioned tournaments, clubs are not required to release players for matches. Usually the only Premier Soccer League players released are non-squad members. Many players are selected from the National First Division (second tier) and Vodacom League (third tier).

Match status
Matches played by the team are not classified as 'A-level' internationals. Thus caps awarded for matches do not count as senior national team caps. Matches played by the team also do not count towards FIFA ranking points, even when the team plays other countries' senior national teams.

Recent and future matches
Recent results

Upcoming matches

Current squad
A 23-man squad was selected for the 2011 African Nations Championship.

|-----
! colspan="9" bgcolor="#B0D3FB" align="left" |

|-----
! colspan="9" bgcolor="#B0D3FB" align="left" |

|-----
! colspan="9" bgcolor="#B0D3FB" align="left" |

Recent callups
The following 5 players have been selected by South Africa Development in the past 12 months, but were not selected in the squad to play the 2011 African Nations Championship, or withdrew from the squad due to injury. Only players available for call-up, not retired players. 

|-----
! colspan="9" bgcolor="#B0D3FB" align="left" |
|----- bgcolor="#DFEDFD"

|-----
! colspan="9" bgcolor="#B0D3FB" align="left" |
|----- bgcolor="#DFEDFD"

|----- bgcolor="#DFEDFD"

|}

Tournament records

African Nations Championship record

COSAFA Cup record

Before the 2008 tournament, SAFA sent the senior team.

Honours
COSAFA Cup: 1
 2008

Prior to 2008, SAFA sent the senior national team to the COSAFA Cup.

References

External links
South Africa FA official website

South Africa national soccer team
National A' association football teams